The Haves and the Have Nots is a 2012 American stage play created, produced, written, and directed by Tyler Perry. It stars Palmer Williams Jr. as Floyd and Patrice Lovely as Hattie. The live performance released on DVD (July 9, 2013) was recorded live in Atlanta at the Cobb Energy Performing Arts Centre on June 8 - 9, 2012. The DVD was released alongside Temptation: Confessions of a Marriage Counselor.

Plot
The story follows the life of a wealthy family confronted with the needs of their  poverty-stricken housekeeper.

Shows

Cast
 Palmer Williams Jr. as Floyd 
 Patrice Lovely as Hattie 
 Tony Hightower as Frank
 Jeffery Lewis as Wallie
 Kislyck Halsey as Rose
 Maurice Lauchner as Lewis
 Alexis Jones as Diane

The Band 

 Ronnie Garrett - Musical Director & Bass Guitar
 Derek Scott - Guitar
 Marcus Williams - Drums
 Michael Burton - Saxophone
 Saunders Sermon - Trombone
 Natalie Ragins - Keyboards
 Melvin Jones - Trumpet
 Rashad Henderson - Background Vocals
 Greg Kirkland - Background Vocals
 Lindsey Fields - Background Vocals

Musical Numbers 
All songs written and/or produced by Tyler Perry and Elvin D. Ross.
 "He's Able" - Rose
 "Watch Your Man" - Floyd
 "Did You Know?" - Diane
 "Falling Apart" - Hattie, Rose, Wallie and Frank
 "You Gotta Go" - Louis
 "Jesus, I Call Upon Your Name" - Hattie
 "I Thank You" - Wallie
 "I Need You" - Frank
 "Winter Will Come (Pray In The Holy Ghost)" - Entire Cast

TV series adaptation
The play was very loosely adapted into The Haves and the Have Nots on the OWN television station. Apart from featuring the lives of a wealthy family and poor-class one, the series significantly differed from the play. The series featured entirely new fictional characters, situations and cast. The television series quickly became one of OWN's most popular programs, pioneering scripted entertainment for that network. The show ran for 8 seasons from May 28, 2013 to July 20, 2021, on the Oprah Winfrey Network.

External links
Tyler Perry Official website
The Haves and the Have Nots page

Plays by Tyler Perry
2012 plays
African-American plays